The 2013 Jerusalem mayoral election was held on 2 October, 2013, and saw the reelection of Nir Barkat.

The election was part of the 2013 Israeli municipal elections.

Campaigning
Lion was regarded as the candidate of the far-right, as was strongly linked to Avigdor Lieberman. The candidate of Likud-Yisrael Beiteinu (an alliance between the Likud party led by Prime Minister Benjamin Netanyahu and the Yisrael Beiteinu party led by Lieberman), he was regarded as Lieberman's candidate. It was believed that Lieberman had hoped that a Lion victory would bolster his chances of potentially challenging Netanyahu's leadership. Pundits observed that Haredi opponents of Netanyahu's government were supporting Lion in hopes a victory for him would help provide momentum to topple Netanyahu's coalition in the Knesset. Also supporting Lion was Aryeh Deri, the chairman of the Shas party. Lion did not receive the support of Netanyahu, who formally remained neutral in the race, but was speculated to favor Barkat.

Barkat was endorsed by the Israel Hayom newspaper. Lion 
was endorsed by Yedioth Ahronoth.

It was speculated that a last-minute agreement between Barkat and major sects of the city's Hasidic populace were key in delivering Barkat his reelection.

While the coinciding municipal elections in most other cities relatively attracted little attention, Jerusalem's mayoral race attracted significant attention. The election was tense and hard-fought.

Results

Results

Jerusalem
2013 in Jerusalem
2013
October 2013 events in Asia